The Boricha are a part of the Ahir caste found in the state of Gujarat in India.

Origin 
The Boricha get their name from the Boricha region of Kutch, which was their original homeland, from where they emigrated to Jamnagar District due to a drought. According to other traditions, the word Boricha means those who are of value.  The community are now found in the Jhodia taluka of Jamnagar District, Kutch District, Morvi in Rajkot District and Junagadh District. They are one of the four sub-groups of the Ahir community found in Gujarat.  The community still speak the Gujrati and Kutchi language.

The Boricha are Hindu, and worship Hindu gods and goddesses such as Ram, Shankar, Ganesh, Krishna and Lakhshmi.

References

External links 
 Mehul Boricha

Ahir
Tribes of Kutch
Social groups of Gujarat
Tribal communities of Gujarat